The Proceedings in Courts of Justice Act 1730 (4 Geo II. c. 26) was an Act of the Parliament of Great Britain which made English (instead of Law French and Latin) the obligatory language for use in the courts of England and in the court of exchequer in Scotland. The Act followed a medieval law from 1362 (the Pleading in English Act 1362), which had made it permissible to debate cases in English, but all written records had continued to be in Latin. It was amended shortly later to extend it to the courts in Wales, and to exempt from its provisions the "court of the receipt of his Majesty's exchequer" in England. It never applied to cases heard overseas in the court of admiralty.

A similar act was passed on 22 November 1650 by the Rump Parliament during the Commonwealth of England: Act for turning the Books of the Law and all Process and Proceedings in Courts of Justice into the English Tongue.

The Act was introduced by the then Lord Chancellor, Lord King, and came into force on 25 March 1733. It was repealed by the Civil Procedure Acts Repeal Act 1879.

A similar Act was passed by the Parliament of Ireland in 1737, the Administration of Justice (Language) Act (Ireland) 1737.

See also
 Ordinance of Villers-Cotterêts, French law mandating legal use of French, rather than Latin

Notes

External links
Text of Act

Great Britain Acts of Parliament 1730
Language policy in the United Kingdom
English law
Scots law